Lidov may refer to the following:

 Mikhail Lidov (1926-1933), Soviet space scientist;
 Alexei Lidov (born 1959), Russian art historian, son of Mikhail Lidov;
 Arthur Lidov (1917-1990), American artist, illustrator, muralist, sculptor and inventor; 
 4236 Lidov, asteroid named after Mikhail Lidov;